Gloninger Estate is a historic home located at North Cornwall Township, Lebanon County, Pennsylvania. It was built about 1785, and is a -story, limestone residence, built into a bank of limestone rock.  It has a steeply pitched roof and is reflective of the "Swiss-German" architectural style.  Also on the property is a contributing limestone smokehouse.

It was added to the National Register of Historic Places in 1980.

References

German-American culture in Pennsylvania
Houses on the National Register of Historic Places in Pennsylvania
Houses completed in 1785
Houses in Lebanon County, Pennsylvania
Swiss-American culture in Pennsylvania
National Register of Historic Places in Lebanon County, Pennsylvania